Bhussi Kathian (also Bhusi Kathia) is a village located on River Ravi in the District Toba Tek Singh of Punjab Province in Pakistan. It is populated by Kathia tribe, who had strong hold of the area since prepartition era. Kathias are active in politics since pre partition era. Kathias of Bhussi were in good terms with British administrators and enjoyed many favours during their era. Huge masses of land were allotted to the residents of Bhussi Kathian, making it the center of power and wealth. Most people depend on agriculture and livestock farming to earn bread.

The annual festival of "Jashn e Naurooz" is celebrated in spring, on 20–23 March. It is of religious significance in a traditional way. Horse dance, Dog fight, Bull race and Volleyball are played here during the festival.
Villages in Toba Tek Singh District
Toba Tek Singh District